Auburn is a borough in Schuylkill County, Pennsylvania, United States. The population was 663 at the 2020 census.

History
The area was historically known as the "Scotchman's Lock". The first house in what is today Auburn was built in the late 1830s by a boatman named Samuel Moyer, who also operated a store there. In 1842, the Philadelphia and Reading Railroad reached the area, at which point the area's official name was changed to "Auburn". The Susquehanna and Schuylkill Railroad reached Auburn in 1857. The first post office in Auburn was built in 1846 and the first school was set up in 1845.

Geography
Auburn is located at  (40.595715, -76.092642).

The borough's terrain is steeply hilly in the north and gently hilly in the south. Auburn's land is mostly forest, with some residential and agricultural areas. The Schuylkill River runs through Auburn. The borough is served by Pennsylvania Route 895.

Demographics

As of the census of 2000, there were 839 people, 325 households, and 242 families residing in the borough. The population density was 505.4 people per square mile (195.1/km2). There were 340 housing units at an average density of 204.8 per square mile (79.1/km2). The racial makeup of the borough was 98.93% White, 0.83% African American, 0.12% Asian, and 0.12% from two or more races.

There were 325 households, out of which 33.5% had children under the age of 18 living with them, 57.2% were married couples living together, 11.7% had a female householder with no husband present, and 25.5% were non-families. 22.5% of all households were made up of individuals, and 10.8% had someone living alone who was 65 years of age or older. The average household size was 2.58 and the average family size was 3.02.

In the borough the population was spread out, with 24.7% under the age of 18, 6.8% from 18 to 24, 32.1% from 25 to 44, 23.7% from 45 to 64, and 12.8% who were 65 years of age or older. The median age was 38 years. For every 100 females, there were 100.2 males. For every 100 females age 18 and over, there were 92.1 males.

The median income for a household in the borough was $36,905, and the median income for a family was $40,833. Males had a median income of $33,021 versus $20,707 for females. The per capita income for the borough was $15,705. About 8.3% of families and 7.7% of the population were below the poverty line, including 12.4% of those under age 18 and 1.8% of those age 65 or over.

References

External links

Populated places established in 1857
Boroughs in Schuylkill County, Pennsylvania
Populated places on the Schuylkill River
1857 establishments in Pennsylvania